Floyd Martin Thornton (often credited as F. Martin Thornton, November 4, 1884 – April 1, 1956) was an American screenwriter and film director active in the United Kingdom in the 1910s and 1920s.

Born in 1884 in New Brunswick, New Jersey, he worked for some years in England. In 1915 he married the British actress Evelyn Boucher at Steyning in West Sussex.  They had two sons, both born in England: Edward E. Martin (1916–2010) and Paul Mulford Martin (1921–1994). In 1925 he and his family left the UK for America, where they all remained for the rest of their lives.

He died in April 1956 in Orange, California.

Selected filmography
Director
Santa Claus (1912)
 Little Lord Fauntleroy (1914)
Dead Men Tell No Tales, 1914 short film  
 The World, the Flesh and the Devil (1914) first feature-length dramatic film made in Kinemacolor
 The New Adventures of Baron Munchausen (1915)
 The Faith of a Child (1915)
 Jane Shore (1915)
 The Man Who Bought London (1916)
 Love's Old Sweet Song (1917)
 A Man the Army Made (1917)
 The Happy Warrior (1917)
 The Great Impostor (1918)
 A Romany Lass (1918)
 Nature's Gentleman (1918)
 The Splendid Coward (1918)
 The Knave of Hearts (1919)
 The Flame (1920)
 The Iron Stair (1920)
 Bars of Iron (1920)
 My Lord Conceit (1921)
 Frailty (1921)
 The Prey of the Dragon (1921)
 Gwyneth of the Welsh Hills (1921)
 Lamp in the Desert (1922)
 Belonging (1922)
 Melody of Death (1922)
 Little Brother of God (1922)
 Women and Diamonds (1924)
 Mutiny (1925)

References

External links

1884 births
1956 deaths
American film directors
People from New Brunswick, New Jersey
Writers from New Brunswick, New Jersey